is a Japanese women's professional shogi player ranked 2-dan.

Early life
Ishimoto was born on January 27, 1999, in Suita, Osaka Prefecture. She first became interested in shogi when she was a fourth-grade elementary school student after seeing some classmates playing the game. She decided that she wanted to learn how to play the game and started attending a local shogi school shortly thereafter.

In 2010, she finished runner-up in the girl's division of the 4th  as well as in third place in the 3rd  tournaments as a sixth-grade elementary school student. Two years later in 2012, she won the girl's division of the 33rd  as a second-year junior high school student. 

Ishimoto was accepted into the Japan Shogi Association (JSA) Kansai Branch's training group system. Although still an amateur player, she defeated a number of women's shogi professionals in the preliminary rounds of the 3rd (2013) and 4th (2014)  tournaments. In 2016, she was promoted to Class B1 of the training group system when she was a 17-year-old third year senior high school student, thus meeting the criteria for the rank of provisional women's professional 3-kyū. She petitioned the JSA, with shogi professional  as her sponsor, to be allowed to compete as a women's professional and was awarded the rank of 2-kyū and full professional status based on her prior performance in the 2013 and 2014 Women's Oza tournaments.

Shogi professional
Ishimoto defeated Kanna Suzuki in the finals of the 3rd  in August 2017 to win her first tournament as a professional. She advanced to the finals of the same tournament the following year, but was unsuccessful in her attempt to repeat as tournament champion, losing to Saya Nakazawa.

Promotion history
Ishimoto's promotion history is as follows.
 2-kyū: September 1, 2016
 1-kyū: February 20, 2017
 1-dan: March 9, 2017
 2-dan: December 14, 2020

Note: All ranks are women's professional ranks.

Major titles and other championships
Ishimoto has yet to appear in a major title match, but she has won one official non-title women's professional shogi tournament.

References

External links
 ShogiHub: Ishimoto, Sakura

Japanese shogi players
Living people
Women's professional shogi players
Professional shogi players from Osaka Prefecture
People from Osaka Prefecture
1999 births